Isaiah 11 is the eleventh chapter of the Book of Isaiah in the Hebrew Bible or the Old Testament of the Christian Bible. This book contains prophesies attributed to the prophet Isaiah. This chapter can be divided into two main parts, verses 1–9 and verses 11–16, with verse 10 as a connecting statement between them. The New International Version entitles the chapter "The Branch from Jesse".

Text
The original text was written in Hebrew language. This chapter is divided into 16 verses.

Textual witnesses
Some early manuscripts containing the text of this chapter in Hebrew are of the Masoretic Text, which includes the Codex Cairensis (895), the Petersburg Codex of the Prophets (916), Aleppo Codex (10th century), Codex Leningradensis (1008).

Some fragments containing parts of this chapter were found among the Dead Sea Scrolls (2nd century BC or later):
 1QIsaa: complete
 4QIsaa (4Q55): extant verses 12-15
 4QIsab (4Q56): extant verses 7-9
 4QIsac (4Q57): extant verses 4-11
 4QIsal (4Q65): extant verses 14-15

There is also a translation into Koine Greek known as the Septuagint, made in the last few centuries BCE. Extant ancient manuscripts of the Septuagint version include Codex Vaticanus (B; B; 4th century), Codex Sinaiticus (S; BHK: S; 4th century), Codex Alexandrinus (A; A; 5th century) and Codex Marchalianus (Q; Q; 6th century).

Parashot
The parashah sections listed here are based on the Aleppo Codex. Isaiah 11 is a part of the Prophecies about Judah and Israel (Isaiah 1–12). {P}: open parashah; {S}: closed parashah.
 {S} 11:1-9 {S} 11:10 {P} 11:11-16 [12:1-6 {S}]

The righteous reign of the Branch (11:1–9)
This part deals with the unbroken continuity between the house of David with the coming messianic king, although the Davidic dynasty was 'cut off to only a stump' because of its pride and corruption.

Verse 1
And there shall come forth a rod out of the stem of Jesse,
and a Branch shall grow out of his roots:
Cross reference: Isaiah 11:10
 "Rod" (also in : or "branch" ( tsemach) in Isaiah 4:2 (a twig, a shoot); these words "are messianic terms."

"Jesse": the father of king David. The naming assures the continuity of the messianic line, but serves as a reminder of David's humble beginnings and divine election rather than on royal pretension and human pride (2 Samuel 7).
 "Branch" -. A twig, branch, sprout or shoot; a word of "messianic terms." The word occurs four times in the Hebrew Bible including this verse. There is another word rendered "branch" ( tsemach) in Jeremiah 23:5; Jeremiah 33:15, although it means substantially the same thing. The word "branch" is also used in rendering several other Hebrew words, but here the word is synonymous with that which is rendered "rod" in the previous part of the verse - a shoot, or twig, from the root of a decayed tree. The word "netser" or "netzer" is the name of the city of Nazareth, which perhaps was so called because of the trees, plants, and grass which grew there. Jesus Christ's dwelling in this city fulfilled a prophecy, that he should be called a "Nazarene"; or an inhabitant of Netzer (Matthew 2:23).
 "Roots": from a decayed tree where a shoot starts up. The Septuagint renders this, 'And a flower (ἄνθος anthos) shall arise from the root'. Chaldee version states 'And a king shall proceed from the sons of Jesse, and the Messiah from his sons' sons shall arise', showing conclusively that the ancient Jews referred this to the Messiah. In the Book of Revelation it is applied to Jesus Christ (Revelation 22:16).

Verses 3–4
 And his delight shall be in the fear of the Lord.
He shall not judge by what his eyes see,
or decide disputes by what his ears hear,
 but with righteousness he shall judge the poor,
and decide with equity for the meek of the earth;
and he shall strike the earth with the rod of his mouth,
and with the breath of his lips he shall kill the wicked.
"And his delight shall be in the fear of the Lord" (English Standard Version): or "and shall make him of quick understanding in the fear of the Lord" (King James Version), translated from Hebrew: , wa- bə- .

Verse 6

 “The wolf also shall dwell with the lamb,
 The leopard shall lie down with the young goat,
 The calf and the young lion and the fatling together;
 And a little child shall lead them.
 Cross reference: Isaiah 65:25
This verse and subsequent verses until verse 9 describe the peace of the Messiah's kingdom, which is also described in the Targum: "in the days of the Messiah of Israel, peace shall be multiplied in the earth" and referred to the times of the Messiah in various Jewish literature, such as in Tzeror Hammor and Maimonides when the Israelites will dwell safely among 'the wicked of the nations of the world' (comparable to 'the wild beasts of the field').
"A little child": Bohlius interprets this with Jesus Christ (cf. Isaiah 9:6)  in particular observes, that they are not to be understood literally, as if the custom and order of things in the world would cease, or that things would be renewed as at the creation, but in a parabolical and enigmatical sense; and interprets them of

Verse 9
They shall not hurt nor destroy in all my holy mountain: for the earth shall be full of the knowledge of the Lord, as the waters cover the sea.
The message in this verse is echoed in chapter 65.

Israel is reclaimed and reunited (11:10–16)

Verse 10
 "And in that day there shall be a Root of Jesse,
 Who shall stand as a banner to the people;
 For the Gentiles shall seek Him,
 And His resting place shall be glorious."
Cross reference: (a) Isaiah 11:1(b) Isaiah 2:3; Isaiah 43:6; Isaiah 49:22; Isaiah 60:3; Isaiah 66:12
Cited by Apostle Paul in Romans 15:12
"Root of Jesse": a sprout, shoot, or scion of the family of Jesse (cf. Isaiah 5:1). This particular "root" (Hebrew: , shoresh) is still alive when the tree is dead, that it can send up a shoot or sprout; it is thus applied to him who should come out of the ancient and decayed family of Jesse (cf. Isaiah 53:2). In Revelation 5:5, the Messiah is called 'the" root" of David,' and in Revelation 22:16, 'the root and the offspring of David'.

Verses 11–16
This part contains an eschatological prophecy (starting with "in that day") about the restoration of Israel's remnant who were scattered to the ends of the earth.

See also

Related Bible parts: Isaiah 4, Isaiah 6, Isaiah 9, Isaiah 53, Jeremiah 23, Zechariah 3, Zechariah 6, Matthew 2, Romans 5, Romans 15, Revelation 5, Revelation 22

Notes

References

Sources

External links

Jewish
Isaiah 11: Hebrew with Parallel English

Christian
Isaiah 11 English Translation with Parallel Latin Vulgate

11